Aborolobatea paracheliformis is a marine species of crustaceans in the Oedicerotidae family, and was first described in 1984 by Michel Ledoyer.

The type was found in the New Caledonian Exclusive Economic Zone, and the species is found at depths of 0 to 30 m.

References

Gammaridea
Crustaceans described in 1984